Austropusilla simoniana is a species of sea snail, a marine gastropod mollusk in the family Raphitomidae.

Description
The length of the shell attains 5 mm.

Distribution
This marine species is endemic to South Africa and occurs off the Cape Province.

References

 Kilburn R.N. (1974). Taxonomic notes on South African marine Mollusca (3): Gastropoda: Prosobranchia, with descriptions of new taxa of Naticidae, Fasciolariidae, Magilidae, Volutomitridae and Turridae. Annals of the Natal Museum. 22: 187-220

External links
 
 Gastropods.com: Austropusilla simoniana

Endemic fauna of South Africa
simoniana
Gastropods described in 1974